Abingdon and Abingdon Abbey were founded in Saxon times, possibly the 7th century. The early history of Abingdon (and its abbey) has been distorted by the numerous legends surrounding its history.  The legends were invented to raise its status and explain the place-name.  The name seems to mean 'Hill of a man named Æbba, or a woman named Æbbe', possibly the saint to whom St Ebbe's Church in Oxford was dedicated (Æbbe of Coldingham or a different Æbbe of Oxford).  However Abingdon is actually in a valley and not on a hill. It is thought that the name was first given to a place on Boars Hill above Chilswell, and the name was transferred to its present site when the Abbey was relocated.

References

Peoples of Anglo-Saxon Mercia